Sobri is a village in the municipality of Valandovo, North Macedonia.

Demographics
According to the 2002 census, the village had a total of 225 inhabitants. Ethnic groups in the village include:

Macedonians 217
Serbs 8

References

External links

Villages in Valandovo Municipality